The 1926–27 Eintracht Frankfurt season was the 27th season in the club's football history.

In 1926–27 the club played in the Bezirksliga Main, the top tier of German football. It was the club's 4th season in the Bezirksliga Main.
The season ended up with Eintracht finishing the Bezirksliga Main as runners-up. In the South German Runners-Up Championship round finished as 3rd.

Matches

Legend

Friendlies

Bezirksliga Main

League fixtures and results

League table

Results summary

Results by round

South German Runners-Up Championship round

League fixtures and results

League table

Results summary

Results by round

South German Cup

Squad

Squad and statistics

|}

Transfers

In:

Out:

See also
 1927 German football championship

Notes

Sources

External links
 Official English Eintracht website 
 German archive site 

1926-27
German football clubs 1926–27 season